The 2022 VCU Rams baseball team represented Virginia Commonwealth University during the 2022 NCAA Division I baseball season. The Rams played their home games at The Diamond as a member of the Atlantic 10 Conference. They were led by head coach Shawn Stiffler, in his 10th season at VCU.

VCU earned their first 40-win season since 2015, and repeated as Atlantic 10 Tournament champions. The reached the Regional Final of the NCAA Chapel Hill Regional before losing to North Carolina in game 7.

Previous season

The 2021 VCU Rams baseball team notched a 38–16 (13–3) regular season record. Due to ongoing issues associated with the COVID-19 pandemic, the Rams began their season on February 20, about a week later than usual, due to the pandemic. VCU won the 2021 Atlantic 10 Conference baseball tournament over Dayton, and qualified for the NCAA Division I baseball tournament for the first time since 2015. They were seeded number two in the Starkville Regional, their highest seeding since 2003. There, they defeated Campbell in the opening round, before losing to Mississippi State, the eventual National Champions, and Campbell for a second loss, causing their elimination.

Freshman Tyler Locklear won the Atlantic 10 Player and Rookie of the Year. Locklear earned a number of allocades including national recognition from ABCA, Baseball America, NCBWA, and Collegiate Baseball.

Preseason

Award watch lists
Listed in the order that they were released

Coaches poll 
The Atlantic 10 baseball coaches' poll was released on February 15, 2022. VCU was picked to finish first in the Atlantic 10.

Preseason Atlantic 10 awards and honors
Tyler Locklear was named the Atlantic 10 Preseason Player of the Year, while Locklear, Mason Delane, and Michael Haydak were named to the All-Atlantic 10 Preseason team.

Preseason All-Americans

Personnel

Roster

Coaching staff

Offseason

Departures

Transfers

Signing Day Recruits
The following players signed National Letter of Intents to play for VCU in 2022.

2021 MLB Draft

Game log

Tournaments

Atlantic 10 tournament 

|

|}

|

|}

NCAA Chapel Hill Regional 

|

|}

|

|}

Statistics
Statistics current through May 20, 2022.

Team batting

Team pitching
{| class="wikitable sortable"
|-
! style="" width="5%" | Team
! style="" width="5%" | 
! style="" width="5%" | 
! style="" width="5%" | 
! style="" width="5%" | 
! style="" width="5%" | 
! style="" width="5%" | 
! style="" width="5%" | 
! style="" width="5%" | 

|- style="text-align:center;"
| VCU || 463.2 || 371 || 215 || 186 || 194 || 509 || 15 || 3.61'''
|- style="text-align:center;"
| Opponents || 441.0 || 552 || 450 || 411 || 305 || 463|| 6 || 8.39
|}

Individual batting Note: leaders must meet the minimum requirement of 2 PA/G and 75% of games playedIndividual pitchingNote: leaders must meet the minimum requirement of 1 IP/G''

Awards and honors

Rankings

References

External links 
 VCU Baseball

Vcu
VCU Rams baseball seasons
VCU Rams baseball
VCU Rams baseball
Vcu
Atlantic 10 Conference baseball champion seasons